is a Japanese footballer who plays as a defensive midfielder for Oita Trinita.

Club statistics
Updated to 1 August 2022.

1Includes Suruga Bank Championship and J2 Play-offs.

References

External links
 Profile at Nagoya Grampus
 

1988 births
Living people
Meiji University alumni
Association football people from Kanagawa Prefecture
Japanese footballers
J1 League players
J2 League players
Júbilo Iwata players
Albirex Niigata players
Nagoya Grampus players
Oita Trinita players
Association football midfielders